In Cold Blood is a 1966 book by Truman Capote.

In Cold Blood may also refer to:

Related to the book
 In Cold Blood (film), a 1967 American film
 In Cold Blood (soundtrack), a soundtrack album from the film
 In Cold Blood (miniseries), a 1996 American television miniseries

Music
 In Cold Blood (Johnny Thunders album) or the title song, 1983
 In Cold Blood (The Legendary Tigerman album) or the title song, 2004
 In Cold Blood (Malevolent Creation album) or the title song, 1997
 In Cold Blood, an album by White Sea (Morgan Kibby), 2014
 "In Cold Blood" (alt-J song), 2017
 "In Cold Blood", a song by Rick Ross from Deeper Than Rap, 2009
 "In Cold Blood", a song by Scarface from The Fix, 2002
 In Cold Blood, a band formerly signed to Victory Records

Video games
 In Cold Blood (video game), a 2000 video game by Revolution Software

See also
 Cold blood (disambiguation)
 Cold-blooded (disambiguation)
 Life in Cold Blood, a BBC nature documentary series by David Attenborough